Frank Glennon (4 January 1919 – 1 April 1992) was an Irish soccer player who played in the League of Ireland during the 1940s.

Glennon played for Bohemians and Shamrock Rovers amongst others during his career in the League of Ireland. He joined the Milltown club for the 1945/46 season. Together with Brendan O'Kelly, he represented Ireland at the 1948 Olympic Games.

Honours

Shamrock Rovers

FAI Cup: 1
  1948:
Inter-City Cup: 1
  1945/46
Dublin City Cup: 1
  1947/48
 Represented Ireland in 1948 Olympic Games

References

External links
 

1919 births
1992 deaths
Republic of Ireland association footballers
League of Ireland players
Bohemian F.C. players
Shamrock Rovers F.C. players
Footballers at the 1948 Summer Olympics
Olympic footballers of Ireland
Association football defenders